Buccinum tsubai is a species of sea snail, a marine gastropod mollusk in the family Buccinidae, the true whelks.

Description
This species has a thin shell with inflated whorls and an oval to oblong, wide aperture. Across the surface run a large number of very fine, reticulated threads. The outer lip is not thick.

The tsubai whelk shows sexual dimorphism, but it is not clear whether the female is larger than the male as is the case in most Buccinum species.

Distribution
This deep-sea marine species can be found in depths between 200 and 1,000 m in the Japan Sea along Japan and Korea.

References

External links
 Akira IGUCHI, Masahiro UENO, Tsuneo MAEDA, Takashi MINAMI, Isao Hayashi , Genetic population structure of the deep-sea whelk Buccinum tsubai in the Japan Sea, Fisheries Science (2004) Volume: 70, Issue: 4, Pages: 569–572
 Chinzei, K., 1973: Omma-Manganjian molluscan fauna in the Futatsui area of northern Akita, Japan. Transactions and Proceedings of the Palaeontological Society of Japan. New Series, no. 90, pp. 81–94, pl. 14

Buccinidae
Gastropods described in 1933